= 2007 Bayelsa State House of Assembly election =

State election in Nigeria

The 2007 Bayelsa State House of Assembly election was held on April 14, 2007, to elect members of the Bayelsa State House of Assembly in Nigeria. All the 24 seats were up for election in the Bayelsa State House of Assembly.

Seibarugu Werinipre from PDP representing Yenagoa II constituency was elected Speaker, while Nestor Binabo from PDP representing Sagbama II constituency was elected Deputy Speaker.

== Results ==
The result of the election is listed below.

- Kuruakegha Dorgu from PDP won Southern Ijaw I constituency
- Kalabo Hawkins Dio from PDP won Southern Ijaw II constituency
- Delight Igali from PDP won Southern Ijaw III constituency
- Konbowei Benson from PDP won Southern Ijaw IV constituency
- Victor Sam Ateke from PDP won Brass I constituency
- Amalanyo Yousuo from PDP won Brass II constituency
- Ruby Benjamin from PDP won Brass III constituency
- Emomotimi Fanama from PDP won Sagbama I constituency
- Nestor Binabo from PDP won Sagbama II constituency
- Ebamua Empere from PDP won Sagbama III constituency
- Ebiundu Komonibo from PDP won Kolokuma/Opokuma I constituency
- Fini Angaye from PDP won Kolokuma/Opokuma II constituency
- Aaron Alokpa A. from PDP won Ekeremor I constituency
- Ebiotu Seleketimibi from PDP won Ekeremor II constituency
- Dein Benadoumene from PDP won Ekeremor III constituency
- Nadu Karibo from PDP won Ogbia I constituency
- Robert Enogha from PDP won Ogbia II constituency
- Walamam S. Igrubia from PDP won Ogbia III constituency
- Egba Alfred from PDP won Yenagoa I constituency
- Seibarugu Werinipre from PDP won Yenagoa II constituency
- Franklin Otele from PDP won Yenagoa III constituency
- Jonathan Obuebite from PDP won Nembe I constituency
- James Ayobegha from PDP won Nembe II constituency
- Otobo Noah Opusiri from PDP won Nembe III constituency
